Steven P. Kramer (born January 1, 1945) is an American former basketball player.

Born and raised in Sandy, Utah, Kramer played college basketball at Brigham Young University.  

As a 6'5" forward, Kramer played for the Anaheim Amigos (1967–68), Houston Mavericks (1968–69) and Carolina Cougars (1969–1970) in the American Basketball Association.

References

External links

1945 births
Living people
American men's basketball players
Anaheim Amigos players
Basketball players from Utah
BYU Cougars men's basketball players
Carolina Cougars players
Houston Mavericks players
People from Sandy, Utah
Small forwards